Henricus hemitelius is a species of moth of the family Tortricidae. It is found in Baja California Norte, Mexico.

References

Moths described in 1991
Henricus (moth)